GoodTimes Entertainment, Ltd. was an American home video company that originated in 1984 under the name of GoodTimes Home Video. Though it produced its own titles, the company was well known due to its distribution of media from third parties and classics. The founders for the company were the brothers Kenneth, Joseph and Stanley Cayre (often referred to and credited simply as the "Cayre Brothers") of Salsoul Records. Its headquarters were in Midtown Manhattan, New York City. The company had a distribution facility in Jersey City, New Jersey and a duplication facility in Bayonne, New Jersey.

History
GoodTimes began with the distribution of copies of public domain titles. Though the company also produced and distributed many low-priced fitness videos, its most recognized line of products were the series of low-budget traditionally animated films from companies such as Jetlag Productions, Golden Films, and Blye Migicovsky Productions, as well as a selection of the works of Burbank Films Australia. Many of its home-video titles—such as Aladdin, Beauty and the Beast, Pinocchio, Sinbad, The Little Mermaid, The Three Musketeers and Thumbelina—were named similarly or identically to big-budget animated films from other studios (though their plots were sometimes very different), and GoodTimes would often release these films close to the theatrical/home-video releases of other studios. This was largely legal, as the stories of the big-budget films were based on folk tales that had long been in the public domain, and the major studios had little room to claim exclusive rights to the stories or the main characters. The Walt Disney Company sued GoodTimes in 1993 because the videotape packaging closely resembled Disney's, allegedly creating the potential of confusing consumers into unintentionally purchasing a GoodTimes title, when they instead meant to purchase a film from Disney. As a result of this lawsuit, GoodTimes was required by law to print its name atop all of its future VHS covers, in order to clearly demonstrate to the public at large that this was not the "blockbuster" title that they would be purchasing. Despite these changes, however, GoodTimes continued to produce animated films based on public domain "knockoff" titles. At the Summer CES 1985, GoodTimes launched a home video label Kids Klassics Home Video, which was specifically designed for a children's audience. The first Kids Klassics videos were 52 different cartoons, which were all meant to be in color and received a 50-50 joint venture with Remco to market the Mel-O-Toons cartoons by Storer Broadcasting. The company made its first licensed client in 1986, by signing a deal with Worldvision Home Video to reissue titles on videocassette, through the Kids Klassics label, which was mostly on Hanna-Barbera cartoons. This was followed in 1987 by signing a deal with major video distributor MCA Home Video to license these titles to videocassette, mainly the Universal Pictures catalog for a price of $15. That year, Goodtimes and Kids Klassics merged their distribution arms to form Goodtimes/Kids Klassics Distribution Corp. In the 1990s they expanded the company into GT Publishing, a division of the company that published children's books under the Inchworm Press imprint. Expanding from home video distribution, GoodTimes founded its spin-off, GT Interactive as a way to distribute video games. This company was sold to the French game publisher Infogrames in 1999. At different times, GoodTimes contracted with Columbia Pictures, NBC, HBO, Worldvision Enterprises, Hanna-Barbera, Orion Home Video, Universal Pictures and Paramount Pictures to release inexpensive tapes of many of their films and TV series. In addition, GoodTimes released several compilations assembled from public domain films, film trailers, earlier television programs and newsreels. Most of these were credited to Film Shows, Inc. In July 2005, GoodTimes filed for bankruptcy and its assets were then sold to Gaiam. Despite its closure in 2005, GoodTimes Entertainment produced at that time a TV series called Wulin Warriors. The series was an edited version of Pili, produced by Broadway Video and Animation Collective for Cartoon Network's Toonami block in 2006. It was pulled after two episodes aired, due to poor ratings and complaints. Gaiam later started a division called GT Media, which served as a general-interest label that released films and non-exercise videos such as animated films from DIC Entertainment and mockbusters from The Asylum. It was later folded into its parent company. Gaiam then spun off its home video assets to Gaiam Vivendi Entertainment in 2012, which in turn was sold and merged into New Video in 2013.

See also 

 Gaia, Inc., the company that fully bought out GoodTimes back in 2005
 Jetlag Productions
 Golden Films
 American Video Entertainment
 UAV Corporation
 Celebrity Home Video
 Phase 4 Films
 Mockbuster
 Vídeo Brinquedo
 Echo Bridge Home Entertainment

References

External links 
 GoodTimes Entertainment (Archive)
 
 Company history at FundingUniverse

 
1984 establishments in New York (state)
2005 disestablishments in New York (state)
American companies established in 1984
American companies disestablished in 2005
Home video companies of the United States
Home video distributors
Companies that filed for Chapter 11 bankruptcy in 2005
Defunct companies based in New York City
Entertainment companies established in 1984
Mass media companies established in 1984
Mass media companies disestablished in 2005